November 5 - Eastern Orthodox liturgical calendar - November 7

All fixed commemorations below celebrated on November 19 by Eastern Orthodox Churches on the Old Calendar.

For November 6th, Orthodox Churches on the Old Calendar commemorate the Saints listed on October 24.

Saints
 Virgin-martyr Manatho. (see also: October 20)
 Virgin-martyrs Tecusa, Alexandra, Claudia, Matrona, Polactia, Euphrosyne, Julia, Euphrasia, Faina, and Athanasia, of Ancyra (303) (see also: May 18)
 Martyr Nikander, by the sword.
 Saint Paul the Confessor, Archbishop of Constantinople (c. 350)  (see also: June 7 - West) 
 Venerable Luke of Tauromenium, monk, of Sicily (820)
 Saint Demetrianus, Bishop of Cytheria on Cyprus, Wonderworker (c. 915)
 Blessed Paul of Corinth, Fool-for-Christ.

Pre-Schism Western saints
 Saint Felix of Thynissa, a martyr who suffered in Thynissa near Hippo (Bone) in North Africa.
 Saint Illtyd (Illtut), abbot, of Llanilltyd Fawr, Wales (505)
 Saint Leonard of Noblac, Gaul (c. 559)
 Saint Leonianus, a hermit near Autun (c. 570)
 Saint Felix, a monk at a monastery in Fondi in the south of Italy (6th century)
 Saint Severus, Bishop of Barcelona in Spain (633)
 Saint Edwen, she is the patron saint of Llanedwen in Anglesey in Wales (7th century)
 Saint Efflamm, born in Britain, he went to Brittany where he became abbot of a monastery he had founded (c. 700)
 Saint Winnoc, Abbot, of Flanders (716)
 Saint Cowey of Portaferry, Abbot, of Moville Monastery (8th century)
 Saint Erlafrid, founder of Hirsau Abbey in Germany, where he became a monk (c. 830)
 Saint Stephen of Apt, Bishop of Apt in the south of France in 1010 (1046)

Post-Schism Orthodox saints
 Venerable Barlaam of Khutyn, founder of Khutyn Monastery, Novgorod (1192) (see also: June 6 )
 Saint Luke, steward of the Kiev Caves (13th century)
 Saint Herman, Archbishop of Kazan (1567)
 Saint Barlaam of Keret, Karelia (16th century)  (see also: January 15 )
 Venerable Agapios the Presbyter (Asimakis Leonardos) (1812)
 Saint Elias Fondaminsky of Paris (1942)  (see also: July 20 )

New martyrs and confessors
 New-Martyr Gregory the Cross-bearer (1936)
 New Hieromartyr Nicetas (Delektorsky), Bishop of Orekhovo-Zuevsk (1937)
 New Hieromartyr Barlaam (Nikolsky), Abbot, of Andreyevskoe, Moscow (1937)
 New Hieromartyr Gabriel (Vladimirov), Hieromonk of the St. Michael Skovorodsky Monastery, Novgorod (1937)
 New Hieromartyr Gabriel (Gur), Hieromonk, of Lytkarino, Moscow (1937)
 New Hieromartyrs Anatoly Berzhitsky, Arsenius Troitsky, Nicholas Dvoretsky, Nicholas Protasov, Constantine Lyubomydrov, Priests (1937)
 New Hieromartyrs of the Kamensk Diocese (1937):
 Vasily Vakhnin, Joseph Chekhranov, and Theodore Romanovsky, priests. 
 Virgin-martyrs Nina (Shuvalova), and Seraphima (Gorshkova), nuns (1937)
 New Hieromartyr Basil Krylov, Priest (1938)
 Synaxis of the New Martyrs of Sarov:
 Anatole, Basil, Hierotheus, Isaac, and Rufinus (1938)

Other commemorations
 Commemoration of the Sarov Elders: 
 Abbot Pachomius (1794); Hieroschemamonk Joseph (1785); Hieromonks Pitirim (1789) and Matthew (1795); and Monk Joachim (1802).

Icon gallery

Notes

References

Sources
 November 6/November 19. Orthodox Calendar (PRAVOSLAVIE.RU).
 November 19 / November 6. HOLY TRINITY RUSSIAN ORTHODOX CHURCH (A parish of the Patriarchate of Moscow).
 November 6. OCA - The Lives of the Saints.
 The Autonomous Orthodox Metropolia of Western Europe and the Americas (ROCOR). St. Hilarion Calendar of Saints for the year of our Lord 2004. St. Hilarion Press (Austin, TX). p. 83.
 The Sixth Day of the Month of November. Orthodoxy in China.
 November 6. Latin Saints of the Orthodox Patriarchate of Rome.
 The Roman Martyrology. Transl. by the Archbishop of Baltimore. Last Edition, According to the Copy Printed at Rome in 1914. Revised Edition, with the Imprimatur of His Eminence Cardinal Gibbons. Baltimore: John Murphy Company, 1916. p. 343.
 Rev. Richard Stanton. A Menology of England and Wales, or, Brief Memorials of the Ancient British and English Saints Arranged According to the Calendar, Together with the Martyrs of the 16th and 17th Centuries. London: Burns & Oates, 1892. pp. 526–528.
Greek Sources
 Great Synaxaristes:  6 ΝΟΕΜΒΡΙΟΥ. ΜΕΓΑΣ ΣΥΝΑΞΑΡΙΣΤΗΣ.
  Συναξαριστής. 6 Νοεμβρίου. ECCLESIA.GR. (H ΕΚΚΛΗΣΙΑ ΤΗΣ ΕΛΛΑΔΟΣ).
  06/11/2015. Ορθόδοξος Συναξαριστής. 
Russian Sources
  19 ноября (6 ноября). Православная Энциклопедия под редакцией Патриарха Московского и всея Руси Кирилла (электронная версия). (Orthodox Encyclopedia - Pravenc.ru).
  6 ноября по старому стилю / 19 ноября по новому стилю. Русская Православная Церковь - Православный церковный календарь на 2015 год.

November in the Eastern Orthodox calendar